Merseguera is a white Spanish wine grape variety planted primarily in the Alicante, Jumilla and Valencia regions.

Synonyms 
Merseguera is also known under the synonyms Blanqueta, Blanquilla, Escanyagos, Exquitsagos, Exquitxagos, Gayata, Gayata Blanca, Lanjaron, Lanjaron Claro, Macaban, Macabeo Basto, Marisancha, Marisancho, Marseguera
Masadera, Masaguera, Masseguera, Menseguera, Merseguera de Rio, Mersequera, Meseguera, Messeguera, Messeguera Comun, Mezeguera, Mezeyguera, Planta Borda, Planta de Gos, Trova, Uva Planta, Verdosilla, and Verema Blanca.

References

Spanish wine
Grape varieties of Spain
White wine grape varieties